The 1996 Copa CONMEBOL Finals were the final match series to decide the winner of the 1996 Copa CONMEBOL, a continental cup competition organised by CONMEBOL. The final was contested by Argentine club Club Atlético Lanús and Colombian Independiente Santa Fe. 

Played under a two-legged tie system, Lanús won the first leg held in Estadio Ciudad de Lanús in Lanús, while Santa Fe won the second leg at Estadio El Campín, Bogotá. Lanús won 2–1 on aggregate, achieving their first international title.

Qualified teams

Venues

Road to the final 

Notes
 QF = quarterfinal
 SF = semifinal

Match details

First leg

Second leg

See also
 1996 Copa CONMEBOL

References

c
c
1
c
c